Latin American subaltern studies was a group founded in 1992 by John Beverley and Ileana Rodríguez.  Inspired by the South Asian Subaltern Studies group, its aim was to apply a similar perspective to Latin American studies.  It was one of the more important recent developments within Latin American cultural studies, though in the end the group folded owing to internal differences that were both scholarly and political.

The group's "Founding Statement" was published originally in the journal boundary 2, attacking "the limits of elite historiography in relation to the subaltern" (112).  As Horacio Legras summarizes, the group "was largely preoccupied with the different forms in which elite practices disavowed the originality and independence of subaltern actions" (126).

The group's work resulted in a Reader, various journal special issues, and also influenced individual book projects of some of those who are among the most significant contributors to their field.

Among the group's members were:

 John Kraniauskas
 Walter Mignolo
 Alberto Moreiras
 Abdul-Karim Mustapha
 José Rabasa
 Josefina Saldana
 Javier Sanjinés
 Patricia Seed
 Gareth Williams

See also 

Subaltern Studies

References 

 John Beverley, Subalternity and Representation: Arguments in Cultural Theory (Durham NC: Duke University Press, 1999).
 Latin American Subaltern Studies Group, "Founding Statement." boundary 2 20.3 (1993): 110-121.
 Horacio Legras, Review of The Latin American Subaltern Studies Reader.  The Americas 61.1 (2004) 125-127.
 Ileana Rodríguez (ed.), The Latin American Subaltern Studies Reader (Durham, North Carolina: Duke University Press, 2001).
 Ileana Rodríguez,  "Is there a Need for Subaltern Studies?" Dispositio/n 52, 25 (2005): 43-63.
 Gustavo Verdesio, ed., Latin American Subaltern Studies Revisited Special issue of Dispositio/n 25: 52 (2005).
 Jose Rabasa, Javier Sanjines, Robert Carr.  editors.  Subaltern Studies in the Americas.  Special Issue of Dispositio/n

Further reading

 Arias, Arturo, ed. The Rigoberta Menchu Controversy.  Minneapolis: University of Minnesota Press, 2001 (paperback)
 Beverley, John.  Testimonio: On the Politics of Truth.  Minneapolis: University of Minnesota Press, 2004 (paperback)
 del Sarto, Ana and Abril Trigo, eds.  The Latin American Cultural Studies Reader. Durham: Duke University Press, 2004 (paperback)
 Dussel, Enrique.  Etica de la liberacion en la edad de la globalizacion y la exclusion. Madrid: Trotta, 1998 (paperback)
 Freire, Paulo.  Pedagogy of the Oppressed. Continuum International Publishing Group, 2000 (paperback)
 Grandin, Greg.  Empire's Workshop: Latin America, the United States, and the Rise of the New Imperialism. New York: Metropolitan Books, 2006 (paperback)
 Gugelberger, Georg M., ed.  The Real Thing: Testimonial Discourse and Latin America.  Durham: Duke University Press, 1996 (paperback)
 Mallon, Florencia E.  Peasant and Nation: The Making of Postcolonial Mexico and Peru. University of California Press, 1995 (paperback)
 Mignolo, Walter.  The Darker Side of the Renaissance: Literacy, Territoriality, & Colonization. Ann Arbor: University of Michigan Press, 2003 (paperback)
 Mignolo, Walter.  Local Histories/Global Designs: Coloniality, Subaltern Knowledges, and Border Thinking. Princeton: Princeton University Press, 2000 (paperback)
 Moraña, Mabel and Enrique Dussel, Eds. Coloniality at Large: Latin America and the Postcolonial Debate. Durham: Duke University Press, 2008 (paperback)
 Moreiras, Alberto.  The Exhaustion of Difference: The Politics of Latin American Cultural Studies .  Durham: Duke University Press, 2001 (paperback)
 Nance, Kimberley A.  Can Literature Promote Justice?: Trauma Narrative and Social Action in Latin American Testimonio .  Nashville: Vanderbilt University Press, 2006 (paperback)
 Sandoval, Chela.  Methodology of the Oppressed.  Minneapolis: University of Minnesota Press, 2000 (paperback)

External links
 brief overview of the Latin American Subaltern Studies group

Latin American studies